Élisabeth Thible, or Elizabeth Tible (8 March 1757 – after 1784) was a French aviator who was the first woman on record to fly in an untethered hot air balloon. She was born in Lyon on 8 March 1757. On 4 June 1784, eight months after the first crewed balloon flight, Thible flew with Mr. Fleurant on board a hot air balloon christened La Gustave in honour of King Gustav III of Sweden's visit to Lyon.

Ballooning
Monsieur Fleurant originally planned to fly the balloon with Count Jean-Baptiste de Laurencin, but the count gave his position on The Gustave to Élisabeth Thible.

When the balloon left the ground Thible, dressed as the Roman goddess Minerva, and Fleurant sang two duets from Monsigny's La Belle Arsène, a celebrated opera of the time. The flight lasted 45 minutes, covered four kilometres and achieved an estimated height of 1,500 meters. It was witnessed by King Gustav III of Sweden in whose honour the balloon was named. During the bumpy landing Thible turned an ankle as the basket hit the ground. She was credited by Fleurent with the success of the flight both because she fed the balloon's fire box en route and by exhibiting her remarkable courage.

Private life
Little is known of Madame Thible; she is described as the abandoned spouse (épouse délaissée) of a Lyon merchant. No record of her survives as a professional opera singer. She died at some point between the completion of her hot air balloon flight and 1800.

Film
 Venus im Wolkenschiff (Venus in the Cloud-ship) – WDR Fernsehen movie by A. Reeker with Anouk Plany as Élisabeth Thible

Notes

References

Other sources
 Jutta Rebmann:  Als Frau in die Luft ging. Die Geschichte der frühen Pilotinnen (Women went into the air. The history of the early pilots.) Sieglitz. Precinct. 

French balloonists
18th-century French women opera singers
Montgolfier brothers
Year of death unknown
Year of birth unknown
French women aviators
Women aviation pioneers